Radiopetti  is a 2015 Indian Tamil-language drama film directed by Hari Viswanath, starring Ramanujam TVV and Lakshmanan Koratur.

The film became the first Tamil film to win the KNN Audience Award in the official competition in Busan International Film Festival 2015, and was an official selection in Indian Panorama for 46th International Film Festival of India held at Panaji, Goa.

Summary

Radiopetti  is the story of a 70-year-old man, partially deaf and is extremely fond of the valve radio, a gift by his dad when he was a child and he sees his dad through the radio. He became psychologically disturbed when this radio is lost

Cast

Lakshmanan - Arunachalam
Ramanujam TVV - Subramani
Shobana Mohan - Lakshmi
Nivas Adithan - Saravanan
Baby Maya - Tharshini
Master Rohan - Ashwin

Production

Development
Hari Viswanath, a civil engineer by profession explained that the idea of making this film struck him only when he saw an old man, who couldn't hear well walking through the street as nobody paid attention to him. This made Viswanath thinking about the lives of elderly people and his own grandfather who always turn on his Murphy Radio as a routine affair. The radio tune signalled all activities of grandfather as well as Viswanath like praying, reading, going to school, time to eat and so on. Viswanath felt the agony of him when he just thought of losing the radio one day and felt the pain on how he will manage after losing the radio. Viswanath decided to mix this fictional thoughts and real experience into a film and thus Radiopetti began its journey.

Casting
Viswanath signed stage artiste Lakshmanan to play the lead role, Nivas Adithan, who has earlier done Ula and Kaaka Muttai,  Shobana Mohan and TVV Ramanujam in important roles. Lakshmanan has already played the lead role in Viswanath's short film Idukkan.

Filming
Radiopetti was shot in Pondicherry and completed in a 15 days schedule within a budget of one crore.

Accolades

References

External links

2015 films
2010s Tamil-language films
Films shot in Puducherry